Aker Floating Production is a Norwegian Floating Production Storage and Offloading vessel operator. The company is part of the Aker Group with Aker ASA owning 44.27% of the company. It is listed on Oslo Stock Exchange.

The company was founded 14 March 2006, and listed on 26 June 2006. It has purchased three oil tankers for conversion to FPSO vessels, and the first vessel was delivered in the third quarter of 2007. The company plans to have four FPSOs in operation by 2009. First commercial contract for operation was on the Indian oil field Dhirubhai 1.

References

External links
 Official site

Aker ASA
Floating production storage and offloading vessel operators
Oil companies of Norway
Petroleum industry in Norway
Shipping companies of Norway
Energy companies established in 2006
Non-renewable resource companies established in 2006
Transport companies established in 2006
Companies based in Oslo
Companies listed on the Oslo Stock Exchange
Norwegian companies established in 2006